, occasionally credited as Tatsu Yamashita or Tats Yamashita, is a Japanese singer-songwriter and record producer, who is known for pioneering the style of Japanese adult-oriented rock/soft rock music. 

His most well-known song is "Christmas Eve", the best-selling single song released in Japan in the 1980s, appearing on the Japanese singles chart for over 35 consecutive years.

He is known for his collaborations with his wife, singer Mariya Takeuchi, on many songs including "Plastic Love"  as well as with American songwriter Alan O'Day with whom he wrote hit songs "Your Eyes," "Magic Ways," "Love Can Go the Distance," and "Fragile."

Active since the 1970s, Yamashita is considered an important contributor to Japanese music, ranked by HMV Japan as sixth in the Top 100 Japanese Artists.

Career 
Yamashita was a member of the band Sugar Babe with musicians Taeko Onuki and Kunio Muramatsu, who released their only album Songs in 1975. After the group disbanded in 1976, Yamashita signed to RCA and launched his career, releasing the solo album Circus Town the same year. Also in 1976, he teamed up with Eiichi Ohtaki, the producer of Sugar Babe, and Sugar Babe member Ginji Ito to release Niagara Triangle Vol. 1 which was cited by MTV as one of the finest collaborative efforts of that period. His 1979 award-winning album Moonglow gained moderate success, but his 1980 song Ride on Time peaked at No. 3 on the Japanese Oricon and the same-titled album topped the chart subsequently, propelling him to stardom.

Tatsuro's music has been regarded as a symbol of Japanese outdoor music, as represented by Ride on Time and For You in the early 1980s.

In 2011, Yamashita's newly-released album Ray of Hope topped the weekly Oricon Albums Chart, making him the fourth singer to have topped the chart at least once per decade for four decades running.

He has been called a "sound craftsman" because of his commitment to music-making. In addition to the vocal backing chorus, he handles everything from guitar arrangement, computer programming, synthesizer, and percussion by himself. Some of his songs are performed entirely by himself. He is particularly good at guitar rhythm cutting. His music is heavily acoustic, but he also has a wide range of knowledge about analog and digital recording due to utilizing the latest technology in music.

"Christmas Eve," Yamashita's best-known song in Japan and the best-selling Japanese single of the 1980s., first appeared on his 1983 album Melodies. It topped the charts in 1990 and has since ranked in the top 100 on the Japanese charts every Christmas season. The song was most famously a commercial song for JR Central's "Xmas Express." It has sold nearly 2 million copies since its release and continues to be sold in small quantities as a limited edition every Christmas season. 

As a solo artist, Yamashita has released 13 original studio albums, five cover albums, two live albums, multiple compilations, and over 50 singles. He is the most commercially successful Japanese male solo recording artist in the history of the Japanese album chart, selling approximately 9 million albums in total. He has also composed for films and television commercials, and worked on records by other artists. Yamashita frequently collaborated with Alan O'Day, who wrote the English lyrics for some of his most popular songs. He has also collaborated with his wife Mariya Takeuchi, whom he married in 1982. They have one daughter.

Discography

Studio albums

Collaborations

Live albums

Compilation albums

Other releases 
Following materials are not marketed to the record retailers, though they have been available via mail order to his official fan club.

Singles

Awards

Notes

References

External links 
 
  (Japanese)
 Artist Page in Warner Music Japan
 An account of Christmas Eve (Made in Japan ONLY) (in English)

1953 births
Living people
Japanese male singer-songwriters
Japanese male pop singers
Japanese male rock singers
Japanese record producers
Singers from Tokyo
20th-century Japanese male singers
20th-century Japanese singers
21st-century Japanese male singers
21st-century Japanese singers